Eubranchus mandapamensis is a species of sea slug or nudibranch, a marine gastropod mollusc in the family Eubranchidae.

Distribution
This species was described from the Gulf of Mannar, India. It has been reported from Ratnagiri, Maharashta, India. Animals from Thailand are slightly different but are currently considered to be the same species.

References

External links
 

Eubranchidae
Gastropods described in 1968
Taxa named by Visweswara Rao